The Lucas County Recreation Center is a sports and entertainment complex located in Maumee, Ohio on the site of former horse race track Maumee Downs. LineDrive Sportz & Great Sports leases the property from Lucas County. It is the site of the annual Lucas County fair, and currently consists of the following facilities:

Ned Skeldon Stadium
Other athletic facilities including a handball complex, an eight-lane track, two soccer fields, two football fields, six tennis courts, seven baseball diamonds (including one regulation pee wee) with lights and a picnic area.

External links
Lucas County Fair

Convention centers in Ohio
Buildings and structures in Lucas County, Ohio
Tourist attractions in Lucas County, Ohio